The Plastiras Dam is a concrete arch dam in Karditsa regional unit, Greece that impounds the Tavropos (Megdovas) River, creating an artificial lake called  Lake Plastiras.

Name

The dam is named after Nikolaos Plastiras, a Greek general and politician who was the first to visualize the construction of a reservoir in the Agrafa area as early as 1925. He later boosted the efforts while serving as Prime Minister, but did not live to see the construction of the dam.

Background

The river Tavropos was known in the area for causing flooding frequently. In the late 1920s the idea of "constraining" the river flow was adopted by the incumbent Minister for Agriculture, but was met with opposition by both his political rivals and locals. Some of the concerns were the overall cost of the building and the impact a reservoir would have on the landscape. After the Second World War, the idea was revived by Prime Minister Nikolaos Plastiras and was also adopted by the Power Corporation. The Power Corporation included the construction of a dam in the area in its effort to electrify the country. Numerous studies on the project were presented and in 1953 the French Omniun Lyonnais won the international contest for the construction of the Dam.

Construction and specifications

The building was officially begun on December 14, 1955, and the construction lasted for five years. The dam was completed on October 30, 1960.
Plastiras Dam is known as a "Double arched dam" and it is made of concrete. It is unique in Greece and blocks a narrow point known as Kakavakia. The dam is elevated  from sea level. Its overall volume is 100×103 m³.

Local impact

The dam and the formed reservoir protect both the mountainous region of East Agrafa and the Plains of Karditsa from flooding. As a reservoir it provides irrigation water to the area and is also used to supply fresh water to the city of Karditsa and the surrounding villages. Moreover, the dam is equipped with two hydroelectric turbines that have a capacity of 130MW.  Despite the original fears, the formation of the artificial lake is believed to be one of the few cases where the landscape was actually improved. The lake itself is a tourist attraction in Greece. The local economy has been improved since the 1980s due to visitors, and many of the abandoned villages in the area have been revived.

The benefits of the lake as a tourist attraction are so significant that the authorities have decided to limit the use of the reservoir for irrigation and electricity production.

See also

 Energy in Greece
 Renewable energy in Greece

References

External links

Photo of Plastira dam in snow
Photo of Plastira lake in snow
Photo of Plastira lake (2) in snow
Plastiras Lake
Ξενοδοχεία
Κατασκευή ιστοσελίδων

Dams in Greece
Arch dams
Hydroelectric power stations in Greece
Buildings and structures in Karditsa (regional unit)
Dams completed in 1960

de:Plastira-Stausee
el:Λίμνη Πλαστήρα
es:Lago Plastíra
no:Plastira-demningen
ru:Пластира